The planned presidential transition of Mitt Romney, better known as the Romney Readiness Project, refers to the planned transfer of power from President Barack Obama to Mitt Romney, the Republican Party's candidate for president in the 2012 presidential election. As Barack Obama was reelected as President, the transition did not take place.

The transition plan was the first to occur under the terms of the Pre-Election Presidential Transition Act of 2010.

The Edward "Ted" Kaufman and Michael Leavitt Presidential Transitions Improvements Act of 2015 was named in Leavitt's honor and also in honor of the head of the Obama transition team.

Planning

Known internally as "The Readiness Project", transition planning began in April 2012, several months before the 2012 Republican National Convention. Led by Chairman Mike Leavitt and Executive Director Chris Liddell, it consisted of a skeleton staff of four until August, when additional employees were retained. The staff eventually grew to almost 300 people. Other senior executives within the project included Robert Zoellick and Al Hubbard.

Activities undertaken by the Readiness Project included preparing policy briefings for civil servants at federal agencies, which would be delivered by "parachute teams" following the election; creating a list of candidates to fill the several hundred political appointments made by the President; coordinating with the Obama administration for the transfer of occupancy of presidential residences, including the White House and the Number One Observatory Circle; liaising with the United States Armed Forces for the assumption of National Command Authority and launch control of nuclear weapons; and developing a post-election communications plan, which reportedly included a 1,000-word victory speech Romney would deliver. On the evening of the election, the Readiness Project's transition website, declaring Romney's victory, was accidentally pushed live, but was quickly taken down again. The site was built by a Utah-based web development company, SolutionStream.

In accordance with the Pre-Election Presidential Transition Act of 2010, the project was provided with office space by the General Services Administration (GSA) beginning in September 2012, two months prior to the election. The offices of the Readiness Project were shuttered and completely cleared within three days following Romney's defeat. Total spending by the Readiness Project between its inception and dissolution was $8.9 million, with those costs paid by the U.S. government.

Contingency
The Romney team was reported as having shaken off the fear of appearing presumptuous, a fear that hampered the Obama team and hindered them from making adequate transition preparations.

In contrast with the Obama presidential transition, Leavitt communicated directly with White House Chief of Staff Jack Lew, and the two coordinated a plan, putting members of the transition team in charge of various government departments in direct communication with members of the Obama administration. Leavitt described his new style of transition team as "essentially a federal government in miniature."

Impact
The Edward "Ted" Kaufman and Michael Leavitt Presidential Transitions Improvements Act of 2015 was named in Leavitt's honor and also in honor of the head of the Obama transition team. The organization said, "The new law creates a federal overseer for the presidential transition and requires each agency to name a person to manage the process."

Leavitt agreed to work on the planning for Donald Trump's presidential transition, even though he had not endorsed Trump. According to The Washington Post, Leavitt is regarded as an "evangelist for how to run an effective presidential transition." Leavitt stated that he was lending the Trump team his "unique experience" because "[c]ountries are vulnerable during transitions and I see this as a very—almost obligation—to contribute to the country. This is a very serious thing."

Report by Leavitt
In 2013, Leavitt published a 138-page case study of the Readiness Project entitled Romney Readiness Project 2012: Retrospectives and Lessons Learned. In the foreword, Romney wrote, "My campaign was not successful but our Readiness Project team was."

See also

 Mitt Romney 2012 presidential campaign
 Planned presidential transition of John McCain

References

External links
 Romney Readiness Project: Retrospective & Lessons Learned at Amazon.com
 Edward 'Ted' Kaufman and Michael Leavitt Presidential Transitions Improvements Act of 2015. 5 USC 101 note., United States Congress
 Mitt Romney Transition Website Draft Uncovered at HuffPost
 Photos: Mitt Romney's website, if he had been elected at Vancouver Sun

Romney
Mitt Romney 2012 presidential campaign
Cancelled events in the United States